De Coninck (Old Dutch spelling variant of "the king") is a surname, most common in Belgium. It can refer to:

 Albert De Coninck (1915–2006), Belgian communist
 David de Coninck (c. 1644 – c. 1703), Flemish painter
 François de Coninck (1902 – after 1928), Belgian rower
 Frank De Coninck (born 1945), Belgian Ambassador to the Holy See 
 Frédéric de Coninck (1740–1811), Dutch merchant active in Copenhagen
 Giles de Coninck (1571–1633), Flemish Jesuit theologian
 Herman de Coninck (1944–1997), Flemish poet, essayist, journalist and publisher
 Monica De Coninck (born 1954), Flemish politician
 Patrice de Coninck (1770–1827), Flemish jurist 
 Pieter de Coninck (died 1332/3), Flemish leader of the Battle of the Golden Spurs
 Wim De Coninck (born 1959), Belgian footballer

See also
 12526 de Coninck, a main-belt asteroid
 Deconinck
 De Koninck
 De Koning

Dutch-language surnames